Faro/Johnson Lake Water Aerodrome  was located  south of Faro, Yukon, Canada and was open annually from May 2 until October 20 due to ice.

References

Defunct seaplane bases in Yukon